Gashi is a northern Albanian surname associated with the Gashi tribe. Notable people with the surname include:

People

Momonym
Gashi (rapper), or Labinot "Larry" Gashi, an American rapper of Albanian descent, formerly known as The Kid Gashi
Gashi (singer) or Gëzim Gashi (born 1990), a Swedish singer of Kosovan origin

Surname
Ardian Gashi (born 1981), Norwegian footballer
Arsim Gashi (born 1983), Swedish footballer
Dardan Gashi, Kosovar politician
Ervin Gashi (born 1990), Swiss footballer
Ibrahim Gashi, (born 1963), Kosovar scientist of policy and diplomacy
Krenar Gashi, Kosovar journalist
Mirko Gashi (1939–1995), Yugoslav writer
Shaban Gashi (1939–1990), Yugoslav cinematographer and photographer
Shkëlzen Gashi (born 1988), Swiss footballer
Zef Gashi (born 1938), Montenegrin Roman Catholic prelate
Zyrafete Gashi (1957–2013), Kosovar comedian

Albanian-language surnames